Valentine's Night is a 2012 Hindi-language romantic thriller film directed by Krishan Kumar and Baadal. It features Payal Rohatgi, Sangram Singh, Rahul Minz, Neha Thakur as the lead roles. The film's music was composed by Astitva-The Band.
The film, produced by Kirshan Kumar and Sanjeev Malhotra, was released on 10 February 2012.

Cast 
 Sangram Singh
 Payal Rohatgi
 Rahul Minz
 Neha Thakur
 Shaurya Singh as Politician
 Rakhi Sawant as an item number "Gaye Re Gaye"

Soundtrack
The music was composed by (Astitva) THE BAND and released by T-Series.

Critical reception
The film received negative reviews from critics. Avijit Ghosh from Times of India also gave it 3.5/10 stating that "Valentine's Night ends up like one of those car drivers in the movie who doesn't know where to go and keeps circling the streets of Delhi."

References

External links
 

2012 films
2010s Hindi-language films
2012 masala films
2010s romantic thriller films
Indian romantic thriller films